Bill Renton was a professional rugby league footballer who played in the 1920s.

Playing career

County honours
Renton won a cap playing left-, i.e. number 8 for Yorkshire while at Castleford in the 10-33 defeat by Lancashire at Halifax's stadium on 3 November 1928.

Club career
Renton made his début for Castleford in the 0-22 defeat by Hull F.C. on 28 August 1926.

References

External links
Search for "Renton" at rugbyleagueproject.org
Bill Renton Memory Box Search at archive.castigersheritage.com

Castleford Tigers players
English rugby league players
Place of birth missing
Place of death missing
Rugby league props
Year of birth missing
Year of death missing
Yorkshire rugby league team players